The 1943 Naples post office bombing occurred on October 7, 1943, after the U.S. Fifth Army had captured Naples (October 1) and reached the Volturno River (October 6). The Palazzo delle Poste, Naples, an imposing structure, completed in 1936 is located in the center of the city, was looted by Nazi troops during the occupation.  After their retreat it became occupied by families who were made homeless by the bombing and destruction heaped on the city.  This happened during the insurrection that was known as the "Four days of Naples" that had taken place a few weeks earlier. On that morning a series of violent explosions ripped through the building and caused heavy damage to the surrounding buildings and the death of more than 100 people, including women, children and members of a 82nd Airborne Division unit. The unit was commanded by General Matthew B. Ridgway.  An investigation determined that the explosion was the result of several time bombs planted by the Germans six days earlier.

The shockwave threw him to the ground, and the impact sprained his right arm. A photographer for LIFE magazine, Robert Capa, and Acme News photographer Charles Corte began taking pictures of the shattered Post Office and the carnage lying in the streets. One of the physicians on hand was Brigadier General Edgar Hume whose office was across the street from the post office.

References
Will Lang Jr.'s account of the Naples Post Office explosion may be found in:
 Life dated: November 1, 1943 (link)
 Time dated February 14, 1944

Explosions in 1943
October 1943 events
20th century in Naples
Italian campaign (World War II)
Naples Post Office Bombing, 1943
Improvised explosive device bombings in Italy
Naples